Fluorcanasite is a rare calcium, potassium, sodium fluoride silicate mineral, discovered in the Kirovsk mine's dumps, in Russia. It has been approved by the IMA in 2007. The name fluorcanasite is a portmanteau word, and was made by blending fluorine, a chemical element that can be found in the mineral, and canasite, as the mineral is close to canasite in several ways (analogue of said mineral and a member of the canasite group). Fluorcanasite is also close to frankamenite.

Properties 
It is the triclinic analogue of canasite, and a member of the canasite group. It grows into prismatic crystals that can reach up to 2 mms in size extending along [010]. It is pleochroic, meaning the color of the mineral seems to change depending on the axis it is viewed at. It is coloured amber, purple and lilac respectively along the α, β and γ optical axes. It has a barely detectable 0.77% potassium radioactivity measured by the GRapi (Gamma Ray American Petroleum Institute Units). It consists mostly of oxygen (38.22%), silicon (25.97%) and calcium (15.44%), but otherwise contains potassium (9.04%) - which gives its radioactive attributes - fluorine (5.86%) and sodium (5.31%). Parting is parallel to {001}. Hackly fracture only applies on the b axis, among a and c axis the fracture is stepped.

Occurrences and localities 
Fluorcanasite is a type locality at Mount Kukisvumchorr, Russia. It is associated with pectolite, microcline, nepheline, villiaumite, scherbakovite, rasvumite, lamprophyllite, mosandrite, molybdenite and aegirine.

References

Silicate minerals